The University of Kansas Medical Center, commonly referred to as KU Med or KUMC, is a medical campus for the University of Kansas. KU Med houses the university's schools of medicine, nursing, and health professions, with the primary health science campus in Kansas City, Kansas. Other campuses are located in Wichita and Salina, Kansas, and is connected with the University of Kansas Health System.

History 
The School of Medicine was formed in 1905, with several Kansas City hospitals being combined within the next ten years. In 1947, the campus was renamed to the University of Kansas Medical Center. The campus began expanding its programs over the next forty years, and on February 27, 1990, the hospital performed its first liver transplant.

In 1997, the state of Kansas was struggling to keep the hospital and its medical campus open so the state legislature passed a bill to sell the hospital, and keep the medical campus for schooling.

Since the state separated with the hospital, the Medical Center has turned its focus on cancer. In 2002, the KU Cancer Center was established, with the help of the Kansas masons. It became a National Cancer Institute-designated in 2012 and became a designated "comprehensive cancer center" in 2022.

Academics 

KU Med teaches it courses in both academic buildings, as well as the hospital. KU Med consists of three schools: the School of Medicine, the School of Nursing, and the School of Health Professions. With three campuses spread out in Kansas, the Medical Center employs 4,084 people, with 1,233 of those being teaching faculty. As of October 1, 2018, the KU Medical Center has 3,695 students enrolled.

The executive vice chancellor is Robert Simari.

School of Medicine 

The School of Medicine, which officially began in 1905 by the Kansas Board of Regents in Kansas City, is the only medical school in Kansas. The school offers seven different degree programs, with the only options as master's program or a doctoral program. The other two campuses are in Wichita, which opened in 1971, and Salina.

School of Nursing 
The School of Nursing began in 1905, as well. It offers six degrees. The school opened its first satellite campus in Salina in 2017.

School of Health Professions 
The School of Health Professions was established in 1974 and offers 25 different programs.

Notable alumni 
 Barney S. Graham, NIH virologist, Zika and COVID-19 vaccine specialist
 Jeff Colyer, plastic surgeon and 47th Governor of Kansas
 Paul Randall Harrington, orthopaedic surgeon
 Theodore K. Lawless, dermatologist and philanthropist
 Roger Marshall, US Representative and Senator (2017–present)
 Robert Simari, executive vice chancellor for KU Medical Center
 Kathryn Stephenson, plastic surgeon
 George Tiller, physician
 Milton R. Wolf, physician
 Barbara Bollier, physician and state Senator

References

External links 
 

University of Kansas
University of Kansas Medical Center
Educational institutions established in 1905
Education in Wyandotte County, Kansas
Education in Wichita, Kansas
Education in Salina, Kansas
1905 establishments in Kansas